Erpa may refer to:
 Erie, Pennsylvania, a city of the United States
 Erpa (river), a river of Germany
 Erpa (Cappadocia), a town of ancient Cappadocia
 ERPA, European Research Papers Archive, see Archive of European Integration